Coast Salish languages are a subgroup of the Salishan language family. These languages are spoken by First Nations or Native American peoples inhabiting the Pacific Northwest, in the territory that is now known as the southwest coast of British Columbia around the Strait of Georgia and Washington state around Puget Sound. The term "Coast Salish" also refers to the cultures in British Columbia and Washington who speak one of these languages or dialects.

Geography 
The Coast Salish languages are spoken around most of the Georgia and Puget Sound Basins, an area that encompasses the sites of the modern-day cities of Vancouver, British Columbia, Seattle, Washington, and others. Archeological evidence indicates that Coast Salish peoples may have inhabited the area as far back as 9000 BCE. What is now Seattle, for example, has been inhabited since the end of the last glacial period (c. 8,000 BCE—10,000 years ago).

In the past, the Nuxálk (or Bella Coola) of British Columbia's Central Coast have also been considered Coast Salish. This language shares at least one phonological change with Coast Salish (the merger of the Proto-Salish pharyngeal approximants with the uvular fricatives), but it also displays certain similarities to the Interior Salish languages. If it is indeed a member of the Coast Salish branch, it was the first to split off from the rest.

Languages 
Listings are from north to south.  Peoples generally inhabited the mentioned watershed and the shores if a body of water is mentioned, as well as further environs.  Adjacent tribes or nations often shared adjacent resources and other
practices, so boundaries were seldom distinct.
{| class="wikitable" width="95%"
|- bgcolor="#FFFFFF"
! Language Name
! Variations
! IPA
! Community Where Spoken
|- bgcolor="#FFFFFF"
| Comox/Island Comox (†)
| ʔayʔajusəm
| 
| Comox, Island Comox (Courtenay area).
|- bgcolor="#FFFFFF"
| Sliammon/Mainland Comox
| ʔayʔajuθəm
| 
| Homalco (Xwemalhkwu), Klahoose, and Sliammon (Tla A'min).
|- bgcolor="#FFFFFF"
| Pentlatch (†)
| Puntlatch, Puntledge
| 
| 
|- bgcolor="#FFFFFF"
| rowspan=3|Halkomelem
| Hul'q'umín'um| 
| Snaw-naw-as, Snuneymuxw, Somena, Chemainus, Cowichan, Halalt, Lyackson, Lamalchi, and Penelakut.
|- bgcolor="#FFFFFF"
| hǝn̓q̓ǝmin̓ǝm̓
| 
| Musqueam, Tsleil-waututh, Kwikwetlem, Tsawwassen, Kwantlen (both Halkomelem and Halkomelem or up river and down river).
|- bgcolor="#FFFFFF"
| Halq'eméylem, Stó:lō, Teyt
| 
| Aitchelitz, Chawathil, Cheam, Chehalis (Sts'Ailes), Katzie, Kwantlen, Kwaw-kwaw-Apilt, Leq'a:mel, Matsqui, Peters, Popkum, Scowlitz (Skaulits), Seabird Island, Shxw'ow'hamel, Skawahlook, Skowkale, Skwah, Skway (Shxwhá:y), Soowahlie, Squiala, Sumas, Tzeachten, Union Bar, :New Westminster Indian Band, and Yakweakwioose First Nations.
|- bgcolor="#FFFFFF"
| Sechelt| Shíshalh, Sháshíshálhem
| 
| Shishalh
|- bgcolor="#FFFFFF"
| Squamish| Sḵwx̱wú7mesh Snichim, Sko-mesh
| 
|  Squamish
|- bgcolor="#FFFFFF"
| Nooksack| Lhéchalosem
| 
| Nooksack
|- bgcolor="#FFFFFF"
| Saanich| Northern Straits Salish, SENĆOŦEN
| 
| Saanich, T'souke
|- bgcolor="#FFFFFF"
| Lummi| Northern Straits Salish, xʷləmiʔčósən
| 
| Lummi or Lhaq'temish
|- bgcolor="#FFFFFF"
| Klallam| Sklallam, Nəxʷsƛ̕áy̓emúcən
| 
| S'Klallam or Klallam
|- bgcolor="#FFFFFF"
| Lushootseed| dxʷləšúcid or xʷləšúcid
| 
| Samish or Sʼabš, Skagit or Sqaĵət,  Sauk-Suiattle or Suiʼaẋbixʷ, Snohomish or Sduhubš, Swinomish), Duwamish or Dxʷ'Dəw?Abš and Xacuabš, Smulkamish, Sammamish, Snoqualmie or Sduqʷalbixʷ, Stkehlmish or Sacakałəbš, Suquamish or Suqʷabš, Nisqually or Sqʷaliʼabš, Muckleshoot or Bəpubšł, Puyallup or Spuyaləqəlpubšut, Sahewamish or Sʼəhiwʼabš, Squaxin Island Tribe
|- bgcolor="#FFFFFF"
| Twana| Skokomesh
| 
|  Skokomish 
|- bgcolor="#FFFFFF"
| Cowlitz| 
| 
| Chehalis
|- bgcolor="#FFFFFF"
| Quinault'''
| 
| 
| Quinault
|}

 See also 
Interior Salish languages
Tillamook (extinct Salishan language)

 Notes and references 

 Bibliography 
 Bates, Dawn, Hess, Thom, and Hilbert, Vi; map by Dassow, Laura, 1994, Lushootseed dictionary, University of Washington Press, Seattle and London, . (alk. paper) Revised and expanded update of Hess, Thom, Dictionary of Puget Salish (University of Washington Press, 1976). Accessed Sep 24, 2009.
  . (alk. paper)
  . (acid-free paper)
 Czaykowska-Higgins, Ewa and M. Dale Kinkade (1998) "Salish languages and linguistics" in ibid. (eds.) Salish Languages and Linguistics: Theoretical and Descriptive Perspectives. New York: Mouton de Gruyter, pp. 1–71. .
   Page links to Village Descriptions Duwamish-Seattle section .  Dailey referenced "Puget Sound Geography" by T. T. Waterman.  Washington DC:  National Anthropological Archives, mss. [n.d.] [ref. 2]; Duwamish et al. vs. United States of America, F-275.  Washington DC: US Court of Claims, 1927. [ref. 5]; "Indian Lake Washington" by David Buerge in the Seattle Weekly, 1–7 August 1984 [ref. 8]; "Seattle Before Seattle" by David Buerge in the Seattle Weekly, 17–23 December 1980. [ref. 9]; The Puyallup-Nisqually by Marian W. Smith.  New York: Columbia University Press, 1940. [ref. 10].  Recommended start is "Coast Salish Villages of Puget Sound" .
 Kroeber, Paul D. (1999) The Salish Language Family: Reconstructing Syntax. Lincoln: University of Nebraska Press, .
   Lange referenced a very extensive list.  Summary article
   Lange referenced Lange, "Smallpox Epidemic of 1862 among Northwest Coast and Puget Sound Indians" , HistoryLink.org Online Encyclopedia of Washington State History''.  Accessed 8 December 2000.
 
  
 
 
   Wayne Suttles (ed.)

Further reading 
 Sarah C. Fletcher, (17 April 2000). "The First Nations of the North West Coast-Coast Salish; Connections to the environment, involvement in conservation."  First Nations of the Northwest Coast: Coast Salish
 Tom Dailey.  "Coast Salish Villages of Puget Sound", start page.
 Traditional Ecological Knowledge (PDF).  "Traditional Ecological Knowledge of the Coast Salish informs modern research and resource management."
 "Coast Salish.  Collections: Archeology and Ethnology of the Gulf of Georgia" collection, Province of British Columbia

External links
"Salishan Language Family." Native Languages of the Americas website

 
Indigenous languages of the Pacific Northwest Coast
Indigenous languages of Washington (state)
First Nations languages in Canada
First Nations in British Columbia
Salishan languages